Serginho Paulista may refer to:

 Serginho Paulista (footballer, born 1980), Brazilian football right-back
 Serginho Paulista (footballer, born 1988), Brazilian football defensive midfielder